Myopia, also known as "nearsightedness", is a refractive defect of the eye.

Myopia may also refer to:

Music
 Myopia (Tom Fogerty album), 1974
  Myopia (Rachael Sage album), 2018
 Myopia (Agnes Obel album), 2020
 Myopia (band), a power metal band from Connecticut
 "Myopia", a track from the Moby album Ambient
 "Myopia", a track from the Enter Shikari album The Mindsweep

Other uses
 Alcohol myopia, a cognitive-physiological theory
 Marketing myopia, a concept in strategic management
 Myopia Hunt Club, a foxhunting and private country club